Wayne Leroy McClure, Jr. (July 2, 1942 – June 12, 2005) was an American football linebacker who played two seasons with the Cincinnati Bengals of the American Football League and National Football League. He was drafted by the Kansas City Chiefs in the ninth round of the 1968 NFL Draft. He played college football at the University of Mississippi and attended Hattiesburg High School in Hattiesburg, Mississippi.

References

External links
Just Sports Stats

1942 births
2005 deaths
Players of American football from Tennessee
American football linebackers
Ole Miss Rebels football players
Cincinnati Bengals players
People from Maryville, Tennessee
American Football League players